Speedy  refers to something or someone moving at high speed. 

Speedy may refer to:

Ships
 HMS Speedy, nine ships of the Royal Navy
 Speedy-class brig, a class of naval ship
 Speedy (1779), a whaler and convict ship despatched in 1799 from England to Australia

People
 Speedy (nickname), a list of people
 Speedy Long (1928–2006), American lawyer and politician
 Speedy Mashilo (born 1965), South African politician
 Tristram Speedy or Captain Speedy (1836–1911), English adventurer and explorer and guardian of Prince Alamayou
 Yolande Speedy (born 1976), South African mountain biker
 Speedy (musician), Puerto Rican reggaeton artist Juan Antonio Ortiz Garcia (born 1979)

Fictional characters and mascots
 Speedy Gonzales, a Warner Bros. cartoon character
 Speedy (DC Comics), two DC Comics superheroes, both teenage sidekicks of Green Arrow
 Speed Buggy, an anthropomorphic, fiberglass dune buggy, often nicknamed "Speedy"
 Speedy Alka-Seltzer, the original mascot for the stomach remedy
 Speedy, in two Oz books by L. Frank Baum, The Yellow Knight of Oz and Speedy in Oz
 Speedy, one of the names for Pinky in the game Pac-Man
 Speedy Comet, a type of Prankster Comet from the video game Super Mario Galaxy

Other uses
 Speedy (film), a 1928 silent comedy starring Harold Lloyd
 Speedy (band), a Britpop band
 Speedy (Telkom), an internet broadband access provider of Telkom Indonesia
 Speedy Hire, a British tools and equipment company

See also
 SPDY, a networking protocol
 Spee De Bozo, J. Edgar Hoover's Carin terrier
 Speedee, McDonald's original mascot